Jozef Tibenský (born March 26, 1994) is a Slovak professional ice hockey winger. He is currently a Free agent.

Tibenský was an academy player with HK Ružinov 99 Bratislava and HC Slovan Bratislava as well as a member the Team Slovakia U20 squad before joining ŠHK 37 Piešťany on July 30, 2015. He then moved to HK Poprad the following season, but departed after just eight games and signed with HC Nové Zámky.

On October 20, 2017, Tibenský joined HC 07 Detva. On August 7, 2019, he joined HKM Zvolen.

Career statistics

Regular season and playoffs

International

Awards and honors

References

External links

 

1994 births
Living people
Slovak ice hockey forwards
Ice hockey people from Bratislava
ŠHK 37 Piešťany players
HK Poprad players
HC Nové Zámky players
HC 07 Detva players
HKM Zvolen players
HK Dukla Michalovce players